Ashmyanka is a river in Belarus.  Tributary of Neris (Wilia), it has a length of 104 km, starting from the village of Muravanaya Ashmyanka and passing through the town of Ashmyany (Oszmiana).  It is located in the north of Hrodna Voblast. It flows into the Neris near the village Mikhalishki, northeast of Astravyets.

Rivers of Grodno Region
Rivers of Belarus